U Mumba (MUMBAI) is a Kabaddi team based in Mumbai, Maharashtra that plays in the Pro Kabaddi League. The franchise is currently led by Surinder singh, and will be coached by Anil Chaprana,  coach of Army Kabbadi team. The team is owned by Unilazer Ventures Pvt. Ltd with co - founders in Ronnie Screwvala and Supratik Sen. U Mumba play their home matches at the Sardar Vallabhbhai Patel Indoor Stadium, Mumbai.

In the inaugural season of the PKL, U Mumba were one of the most dominant teams in the league but lost the ultimate match of the competition, thus ending as runner's up to the Jaipur Pink Panthers. In 2015, they were out to make up for their mistakes and successfully won the tournament after defeating Bengaluru Bulls in the Final. Later next season in 2016(January), U Mumba lived up to the tag of the best team in PKL history and made their third successive PKL final before eventually ending as runner's up, as they were defeated by the Patna Pirates by a narrow margin despite a lion hearted comeback in the second half of the final.

Ahead of the June 2016 season, in the PKL auction, U Mumba lost many of their key players who were a part of the squad that reached three consecutive finals. The team wasn't able to deal with the changes as they failed to make the playoffs in the following two seasons- 2016(June) season and 2017. An inspired change of personnel by the owners ahead of the 2018-19 season, saw U Mumba regain their lost touch and qualified for the playoffs after two failed attempts. In the process U Mumba once again became the force they once were, and ended the league stage with dominant wins and the most highest score difference than any other team. But inability to peak in big games with narrow margins, saw them getting knocked out by the UP Yoddha in the playoffs.

U Mumba contest the Maharashtra derby against state rivals Puneri Paltan and have the bragging rights as well by winning 9 of the 15 encounters between the two teams.

In season 7, they went out in the 2nd semi-final losing to the eventual champions Bengal Warriors, by a score of 35-37.

Franchise history

Pro Kabaddi League (PKL) is a professional kabaddi league in India, based on the format of the Indian Premier League T20 cricket tournament. The first edition of the tournament was played in 2014 with eight franchises representing various cities in India. U Mumba is a Mumbai based franchise owned by Unilazer sports promoted by Ronnie Screwvala.

Current squad

Seasons

Season I

U Mumba finished runners-up in the first season after losing to Jaipur Pink Panthers in the finals.

Season II

This season U Mumba finished the league as the Champions.

Season III

Season IV

Season V

Season VI

Season VII

Season VIII

Season IX

Head coach record

Records

Overall results Pro Kabbaddi season

By opposition
''Note: Table lists in alphabetical order.

Sponsors

U Mumba announced TATA Motors will continue as their principle sponsor for Season 4, 2016. Associate sponsors are Enerzal, TVS Tyres, Adidas, Killer Jeans, Lawman pg3, Amul Macho, Prayag, Red FM 93.5, Courtyard by Marriott, Smaaash and Wockhardt Hospitals

References 

Pro Kabaddi League teams
Sport in Mumbai
2014 establishments in Maharashtra
Kabaddi clubs established in 2014